M'tsamoudou is a village in the commune of Bandrele on Mayotte. It is located on the south east coast, north east of the village of Dapani. It has a notable beach. The village covers an area of 3.646 hectares.

References

Populated places in Mayotte